The following is the complete filmography of actress, comedian, writer, producer, and playwright Tina Fey.

Film

Television

Video games

Theatre

Fey also performed at The Second City, both touring and then on the main stage from 1992 to 1997, as well as at ImprovOlympic.

References

Fey, Tina
Fey, Tina